Danny Price is a former college baseball coach and former player. He was the head coach of the Florida International University (FIU) baseball team, a position that he held from 1980 until May 2007. During that span, he recorded a thousand coaching victories, reaching that milestone on March 10, 2005. He was then head coach at Miami Dade College from 2011 until his retirement in 2019, after which he planned to engage in charitable work.

Price, the son of a sharecropper born in North Carolina, attended FIU and played on its baseball team as a student in 1973–74. He made the first hit for FIU, which had opened its doors a year before. He graduated in 1974, and returned as a hitting instructor in 1976.

Former FIU baseball players coached by Price include Major League Baseball star Mike Lowell, and over one hundred other students signed to play professional baseball with major and minor league teams.

At FIU, he was named TAAC Coach of the Year three times.

In 2011, Price was named the head coach at Miami Dade College.

Head coaching record

References

External links
Miami Dade Sharks bio

Year of birth missing (living people)
Living people
FIU Panthers baseball players
FIU Panthers baseball coaches
Miami Dade Sharks baseball coaches